Lansbury Lawrence School (formally Susan Lawrence School) is a primary school in the Lansbury Estate in the Poplar area of the London Borough of Tower Hamlets.

The school was designed by the architectural firm Yorke Rosenberg Mardall.  It was built in 1949–1950 and was debuted in the 1951 Festival of Britain as a showpiece of the "Live Architecture" exhibition.
  The school's foyer contains tiles by the renowned artist Peggy Angus.  It was named after Susan Lawrence, an MP who had represented the area.

The school is Grade II listed.

References

External links
Official website

Educational institutions established in 1951
Grade II listed buildings in the London Borough of Tower Hamlets
1951 establishments in England
Primary schools in the London Borough of Tower Hamlets
Community schools in the London Borough of Tower Hamlets
Poplar, London